Pae-La-Itlhatsoa is a community council located in the Mokhotlong District of Lesotho. Its population in 2006 was 2,080.

Villages
The community of Pae-La-Itlhatsoa includes the villages of Bookamela, Ha Masasane, Ha Nthimolane, Koung, Lekhalong, Letšeng-la-Terae, Lichecheng, Likhutlong, Mafarung, Mahlasela, Majakaneng, Makhalaneng, Maloraneng, Matebeleng, Moeaneng, Nama-u-Lule, Pae-la-itlhatsoa, Patising and Sutumetsa.

References

External links
 Google map of community villages

Populated places in Mokhotlong District